Tideline is a 2012 suspense thriller by the British author, Penny Hancock.

Synopsis
The book is set in Greenwich, by the River Thames in London. The book details how the main character, Sonia opens the door of her house to see a nephew of a family friend, Jez, and how she invites him in and decides she must keep him. The plot is intertwined in deep personal revelations about Sonia's past.

Reception
The book was praised by S.J. Watson as 'Brilliantly written and totally gripping...It's such a thrill to read a book as deliciously dark and richly evocative as Tideline. From the first page to its shocking finale it draws you into its world and won't let go'. It was also praised by Marie Claire and Laura Wilson in The Guardian who described the book as a 'creepy, well-written debut', praising the portrayal of Sonia but describing the portrayal of Jez as less successful. The book was also featured on the Richard & Judy bookclub.

References

Novels set in London
British thriller novels
Psychological thriller novels
2012 British novels
Royal Borough of Greenwich
Simon & Schuster books